Japan competed at the 1964 Winter Olympics in Innsbruck, Austria.

Alpine skiing

Men

Men's slalom

Biathlon

Men

 1 Two minutes added per miss.

Cross-country skiing

Men

Men's 4 × 10 km relay

Figure skating

Men

Women

Ice hockey

First round
Winners (in bold) qualified for the Group A to play for 1st-8th places. Teams, which lost their qualification matches, played in Group B for 9th-16th places.

|}

Consolation round 

Japan 4-3 Norway
Japan 6-4 Romania
Austria 5-5 Japan
Yugoslavia 6-4 Japan
Japan 4-3 Poland
Japan 6-2 Hungary
Italy 8-6 Japan

Nordic combined 

Events:
 normal hill ski jumping 
 15 km cross-country skiing

Ski jumping

Speed skating

Men

Women

References
Official Olympic Reports
Japan Olympic Committee database
 Olympic Winter Games 1964, full results by sports-reference.com

Nations at the 1964 Winter Olympics
1964
Winter Olympics